Dubravko Kolinger (born 29 November 1975) is a German former professional footballer who played as a defender.

Career
He joined VfB Stuttgart II in the summer of 2007 from SV Elversberg.

References

External links
 

1975 births
Living people
German footballers
Association football defenders
Bundesliga players
2. Bundesliga players
3. Liga players
Karlsruher SC players
Karlsruher SC II players
Kickers Offenbach players
FC St. Pauli players
1. FC Schweinfurt 05 players
SSV Jahn Regensburg players
TuS Koblenz players
SV Elversberg players
VfB Stuttgart II players
FC Nöttingen players
FC Nöttingen managers
People from Rastatt
Sportspeople from Karlsruhe (region)
Footballers from Baden-Württemberg